Frank Fox may refer to:

Sportspeople
 Frank Fox (racing driver) (1877–1931), American auto racing driver
 Frank Fox (Gaelic footballer) (1911–1940), Irish Gaelic footballer
 Frank Fox (rugby league) (fl. 1960s and 1970s) rugby league footballer
 Frank Fox (motorcycle racer) in 1957 Grand Prix motorcycle racing season
 Frank Fox (American football) in 1965 American Football League draft

Others
 Sir Frank Fox (author) (1874–1960), Australian journalist and author
 Frank S. Fox (1861–1920), American academic and college president
 Frank Fox (actor) in the 1938 film Second Thoughts
 Frank Fox (composer) for films including The Master Detective
 Frank Fox (writer), see Screen Directors Playhouse
 Frank Fox, for whom Fox, Oklahoma was named

See also 
 Francis Fox (disambiguation)
 Mary Frank Fox, sociologist